Lanepitant (INN, code name LY303870) is a drug developed by Eli Lilly which acts as a selective antagonist for the NK1 receptor, and was one of the first compounds developed that act at this target. It was under development as a potential analgesic drug, but despite promising results in initial animal studies, human clinical trials against migraine, arthritis and diabetic neuropathy all failed to show sufficient efficacy to support further development, with the drug being only marginally more effective than placebo and inferior to older comparison drugs such as naproxen. Failure of analgesic action was thought to be due to poor penetration of the blood–brain barrier in humans, but research has continued into potential applications in the treatment of other disorders with a peripheral site of action, such as corneal neovascularization.

References 

NK1 receptor antagonists
Peripherally selective drugs